"The New Exhibit" is an episode of the American television anthology series The Twilight Zone. In this episode a museum worker (played by Martin Balsam) takes a set of wax figures into his home, where they begin to show the homicidal tendencies of the famous murderers they depict.

Opening narration

Plot
Martin Senescu works at a wax museum. His boss and best friend, Mr. Ferguson, informs him that, due to a long-term decline in sales and his desire to retire, he is selling the museum, which will be torn down and replaced by a supermarket. The dispirited Martin, desperate to save the figures from the "Murderer's Row" exhibit - Jack the Ripper, Albert W. Hicks, Henri Désiré Landru, William Burke and William Hare - volunteers to keep them at his house until a buyer can be found for them.

Martin's wife, Emma, becomes frustrated at having the figures in their basement. They require an air conditioner to keep from melting, and due to the hot weather, the resultant electric bill wipes out their savings within a month. Martin makes only perfunctory efforts at finding a buyer for the figures, instead spending most of his time tending to them. Emma is disconcerted by this, especially when he begins talking about and to them as if they were alive. Her brother, Dave, advises her to shut off the air conditioning so that the figures will melt. After one last effort to convince Martin to return the figures to Ferguson's care, Emma sneaks out of bed one night and goes down to the basement. When she tries to shut off the air conditioner, the Jack the Ripper figure stabs her.

The next morning, Martin discovers his wife dead and Jack's bloody knife. Realizing no one will believe Emma was killed by a wax figure, he buries her under the basement floor. The next day, Dave pays a visit. Martin nervously claims to have gotten rid of the wax figures, which arouses Dave's suspicions when he hears the air conditioner hum and finds the basement door locked. When he presses Martin further about Emma's whereabouts, Martin rushes him out of the house. Dave then sneaks into the basement through the back entrance. While he is examining the area, the Hicks figure strikes Dave with its axe. Martin comes down later to find the carnage.

Several weeks later, Ferguson comes by to tell Martin that he has sold the figures to the legendary Marchand's Wax Museum in Brussels. However, Martin is still reluctant to give up the wax figures he has so greatly cared for. While he goes upstairs and makes tea, Ferguson takes measurements of the figures for the buyer. When he makes a passing remark about Landru's width, the latter strangles him. Martin comes downstairs with the tea and finds Ferguson's body. Deeming this the last straw, Martin rebukes the figures and grabs a crowbar, planning to smash them. Suddenly, the wax figures come off their pedestals and advance on him, claiming he murdered Emma, Dave, and Ferguson despite not being in the basement when the murders occurred. Martin screams as the figures close in.

Years later, at Marchand's, the five murderer figures are now accompanied by a wax figure of Martin, who is believed to have killed Emma, Dave, and Ferguson.

Closing narration

Cast
Martin Balsam as Martin Lombard Senescu
Will Kuluva as Mr. Ferguson
Maggie Mahoney as Emma Senescu
William Mims as Dave
Marcel Hillaire as Guide
Milton Parsons as Henri Désiré Landru
David Bond as Jack the Ripper
Billy Beck as William Hare
Phil Chambers as Gas Man
Bob Mitchell as Albert W. Hicks
Robert McCord as William Burke

References

External links

1963 American television episodes
The Twilight Zone (1959 TV series season 4) episodes
Television episodes about Jack the Ripper
Uxoricide in fiction
Cultural depictions of Henri Désiré Landru
Television episodes written by Jerry Sohl